Lord Frederick may refer to:

 Lord Frederick Beauclerk (1773–1850), noted English cricketer
 Lord Frederick Cambridge (1907–1940), descendant of the British Royal Family
 Lord Frederick Campbell (1729–1816), Scottish nobleman and politician
 Lord Frederick Cavendish (1836–1882), English Liberal politician
 Lord Frederick Cavendish (British Army officer) (1729–1803), British field marshal and Whig politician
 Lord Frederick FitzClarence (1799–1854), Knight Grand Cross of the Royal Guelphic Order
 Lord Frederick Spencer Hamilton (1856–1928), United Kingdom politician
 Lord Frederick Windsor (born 1979), British financial analyst

See also
 Frederick Lord (disambiguation)